Bath High School (BHS), sometimes called Lima Bath, is a public high school in Bath Township, near Lima, Ohio, United States.  It is the only high school in the Bath Local School District.

Athletics
The school's mascot is a wildcat for boys' sports, and a wildkitten for girls'.  They are members of the Western Buckeye League.

State championships

 Boys golf - 2005 
 Girls basketball – 1987 
 Softball – 2001, 2014

Recognition
U.S. News & World Report listed Bath High School as a bronze medal school in their America's Best High Schools rankings in 2009 and 2015. BHS was the only high school in Allen County to be recognized. The Ohio Department of Education named BHS a "School of Promise" in 2011, 2012, and 2014 along with "Excellent" ratings in the state report card every year from 2000 through 2013.

External links

Notes and references

High schools in Allen County, Ohio
Public high schools in Ohio